Stephen Buer (born 16 January 1999) is a Ghanaian footballer who plays as a midfielder for Spanish club CF Fuenlabrada.

Club career
Born in Accra, Buer finished his formation with Spanish side CD Leganés before signing for Segunda División B side Internacional de Madrid in the 2018 summer. On 7 February of the following year, he returned to Lega and was assigned to the reserves in the Tercera División.

On 17 August 2019, after appearing in just 21 minutes for the Pepineros, Buer joined Fútbol Alcobendas Sport also in the fourth division. In 2021, he moved to CF Fuenlabrada and was assigned to the B-team in the regional leagues.

Buer made his first-team debut for Fuenla on 15 August 2021, coming on as a late substitute for Cristóbal Márquez in a 1–2 home loss against CD Tenerife in the Segunda División. On 21 January 2023, he renewed his contract until 2025, being definitely promoted to the main squad now in Primera Federación.

References

External links

1999 births
Living people
Footballers from Accra
Ghanaian footballers
Association football midfielders
Segunda División players
Primera Federación players
Tercera División players
Tercera Federación players
Divisiones Regionales de Fútbol players
Internacional de Madrid players
CD Leganés B players
CD Paracuellos Antamira players
CF Fuenlabrada B players
CF Fuenlabrada footballers
Ghanaian expatriate footballers
Ghanaian expatriate sportspeople in Spain
Expatriate footballers in Spain